The Group 15 Rugby League, now known as Barwon Darling Rugby League Cup is a rugby league competition in Far North West NSW. 

The competition has six teams from across Western NSW, with another currently in recess.

History 
Group 15 was a defunct rugby league competition based in the northeastern quarter of the Western Division, New South Wales, Australia. The last premiership was held in 1992 with Lightning Ridge beating Bourke. 

Group 15 clubs currently play in the revamped Barwon Darling Rugby League Cup, which is essentially a reformed Group 15 Premiership, run by the Country Rugby League as part of Region 4 (Western Rams).

Barwon Darling Rugby League Cup
The Barwon Darling Rugby League is the new competition held in the area following the demise of Group 15. Five former Group 15 clubs are involved, plus the more recently formed Newtown Wanderers club, with towns such as Bourke, Brewarrina, Goodooga, Lightning Ridge and Walgett (Dragons and Wanderers) entering teams. Collarenebri has also fielded sides in the past, but are currently in recess. The competition is the a key social event in most of the communities involved, as they are small rural townships.

The competition has been dominated by the Walgett Dragons and Bourke Warriors in recent years, with many premierships going to either one of the sides, with Brewarrina being the other consistently competitive side. Goodooga broke a 34 year title drought in 2022 defeating Bourke 27-26 to claim the title.

Teams

Barwon Darling Rugby League Cup Teams

Former Group 15 teams included 
 Barwon United (folded)
 Bourke Warriors
 Brewarrina Googars
 Canbelego
 Cobar Roosters (Now in Castlereagh League)
 Collarenebri Bulldogs
 Goodooga Magpies
 Lightning Ridge Redbacks
 Mungindi Grasshoppers (only play knockouts)
 Nyngan Tigers (Now in Group 11/Peter McDonald Premiership)
 Walgett Dragons

Grand Finals

Barwon Darling Rugby League

Group 15 Rugby League

Sources

References

Defunct rugby league competitions in New South Wales